Brydges Place is an alley between St Martin's Lane and Bedfordbury in the City of Westminster, Greater London, running alongside the Coliseum.

In 2019, the alley was used as a filming location for Last Christmas.

References

Footpaths in London
Covent Garden